Jilbe (also known as Zoulbou) is an Afro-Asiatic language spoken in a single village in Borno State, Nigeria. It is also called Zoulbou.

It is spoken in Jilbe town, across the Cameroon border from Dabanga town.

Notes 

Biu-Mandara languages
Languages of Nigeria
Endangered Afroasiatic languages